German submarine U-734 was a Type VIIC U-boat built for Nazi Germany's Kriegsmarine for service during World War II.
She was laid down on 20 October 1941 by Schichau-Werke, Danzig as yard number 1525, launched on 19 September 1942 and commissioned on 5 December 1942 under Oberleutnant zur See Hans-Jörg Blauert.

Design
German Type VIIC submarines were preceded by the shorter Type VIIB submarines. U-734 had a displacement of  when at the surface and  while submerged. She had two shafts and two  propellers.

U-734 was fitted with five  torpedo tubes (four fitted at the bow and one at the stern), fourteen torpedoes, one  SK C/35 naval gun, 220 rounds, and two twin  C/30 anti-aircraft guns. The boat had a complement of between forty-four and sixty.

Service history
The boat's career began with training at 8th U-boat Flotilla on 5 December 1942, followed by active service on 1 August 1943 as part of the 3rd Flotilla for the remainder of her service.

In two patrols she sank no ships.

Wolfpacks
U-734 took part in three wolfpacks, namely:
 Coronel (4 – 8 December 1943)
 Coronel 2 (8 – 14 December 1943)
 Igel 2 (9 February 1944)

Fate
U-734 was sunk on 9 February 1944 in the North Atlantic, SW of Ireland, in position , by depth charges from Royal Navy sloops  & . All hands were lost.

References

Bibliography

External links

German Type VIIC submarines
1942 ships
U-boats commissioned in 1942
Ships lost with all hands
U-boats sunk in 1944
U-boats sunk by depth charges
U-boats sunk by British warships
World War II shipwrecks in the Atlantic Ocean
World War II submarines of Germany
Ships built in Danzig
Maritime incidents in February 1944
Ships built by Schichau